John Croft may refer to:
John Croft (Australian politician), Senator for Western Australia
John Croft (MP) (died 1420) for Lancashire
John Croft (wine merchant) (1732–1820), English businessman, antiquarian and writer
Sir John Croft, 1st Baronet (1778–1862), English diplomat
John R. Croft, United States Air National Guard general
John Croft (architect) (1800–1865), British architect
Sir John Croft, 4th Baronet (c. 1735–1797)
Sir John Frederick Croft, 2nd Baronet (1828–1904), of the Croft baronets
Sir John William Graham Croft, 4th Baronet (1910–1979), of the Croft baronets
Sir John Archibald Radcliffe Croft, 5th Baronet (1910–1990), of the Croft baronets

See also
John Crofts (disambiguation)
Croft (surname)